Raúl Ricardo dos Santos González (born 19 April 1967) is a former Uruguayan footballer who played as a forward.

Club career
Dos Santos began his career in his native Uruguay, playing for Basáñez. In 1991, Dos Santos signed for Defensor Sporting, playing for the club for a year. In 1992, Dos Santos moved to Spain, signing for Albacete. During his time with the La Liga team, Dos Santos scored 15 league goals in 46 games. In 1994, Dos Santos signed for Segunda División club Villarreal. During his two seasons with Villarreal, Dos Santos played 36 league games, scoring twelve times. In 1996, returned to Uruguay, re-signing for former club Defensor Sporting. In 1997, Dos Santos moved to Bolivia, signing for Bolivar. After a season with Bolivar, Dos Santos returned to Uruguay, signing for Progreso. In 1999, Dos Santos played for Cerro before his retirement.

International career
Dos Santos represented Uruguay twice, making his debut against Poland on 29 November 1992.

References

1967 births
Living people
Uruguayan footballers
Footballers from Montevideo
Uruguay international footballers
Association football forwards
Defensor Sporting players
Albacete Balompié players
Villarreal CF players
Club Bolívar players
C.A. Progreso players
C.A. Cerro players
La Liga players
Segunda División players